Vanlalzahawma (born 29 December 2000) is an Indian professional footballer who plays as a midfielder for Sudeva Delhi FC in the I-League.

Career

Vanlalzahawma made his first professional appearance for Sudeva Delhi FC on 9 January 2021 against Mohammedan SC as substitute on 81st minute.

Career statistics

References

2000 births
Living people
Footballers from Mizoram
Indian footballers
Sudeva Delhi FC players
I-League players
Association football midfielders